The 2022 Indy Lights presented by Cooper Tires was the 36th and final season of the Indy Lights open wheel motor racing series and the 20th sanctioned by IndyCar, acting as the primary support series for the IndyCar Series. It was held over 14 races, consisting of two ovals and nine road and street courses.

Linus Lundqvist, driving for HMD Motorsports with Dale Coyne Racing, won the drivers' championship at the penultimate race of the season. Andretti Autosport won the teams' championship, while their driver Hunter McElrea became rookie of the year.

2022 was also the final season of Indy Lights utilizing Indy Lights moniker. From 2023 onwards the Indy Lights would be rebranded to Indy NXT.

Series news 

 On September 24, 2021, it was announced that Penske Entertainment, the owner of INDYCAR, would take over promotion of the series from Andersen Promotions, who remained responsible for the rest of the Road to Indy.  The Goodyear Tire and Rubber Company would continue sponsoring the series, as Goodyear acquired Cooper Tire in 2021.  Branding would remain as Cooper.
 On February 22, 2022, it was announced that as part of IndyCar taking over the role of the sanctioning body, Indy Lights would adjust its points structure to follow that of the IndyCar series.
On June 22, 2022, it was announced that Firestone will become the sole tire supplier for Indy Lights starting in 2023, replacing Cooper Tires and returning to the series for the first time since 2013.

Team and driver chart 
The following drivers and teams competed in the series:

Schedule 
The provisional schedule was announced on January 11, 2022. Only three events of the schedule were double-header weekends, a significant change from 2021.

Race results

Season report

First half 
The first event of the season was held in February on the Streets of St. Petersburg, and it began with Hunter McElrea scoring pole on his first Indy Lights weekend. He held the lead at the race start ahead of fellow rookie Christian Rasmussen, who rose to second at the first corner. Rasmussen gained the lead on lap 13, when McElrea crashed into the wall at turn 14. From there on, Rasmussen survived the restart as well as another cautin and looked set to win on his debut, before he suddenly stopped on the penultimate lap because he ran out of fuel. This promoted Matthew Brabham into the lead, who then won the race after a six-year absence from the series. Benjamin Pedersen came second, ahead of Linus Lundqvist.

After a one-month break, Barber Motorsports Park in Alabama was next on the schedule, where HMD Motorsports locked out the front row courtesy of Lundqvist and Pedersen. The race was postponed and shortened because of thunderstorms, and began in wet conditions. Lundqvist used the superior visibility coming with his first grid spot to quickly pull out a gap to the field. By mid-race, the track was almost dry, so grip levels were decreasing. Many drivers made mistakes, span or ran off the track, with James Roe Jr., Christian Bogle and McElrea all retiring. In the final stages of the race, Pedersen was increasing his pressure on leader Lundqvist, but did not manage to pass him and eventually finished only a tenth of a second behind in second place, ahead of Sting Ray Robb. The win also meant Lundqvist moved up into the championship lead.

The first double-header weekend came at the Indianapolis Motor Speedway road course. Lundqvist continued his form, claiming pole for both races despite suffering a puncture in his first qualifying run. He held the lead at the start of the first race, but was soon overtaken by Rasmussen, who started third and passed McElrea into turn one. When Lundqvist tried to regain first place, the pair collided. Both cars suffered damage, with Lundqvist having to pit. This warranted a caution and promoted McElrea to the lead, but he was passed by Danial Frost at the restart. Frost held his lead until the finish, leading home McElrea and Robb, with Rasmussen and Lundqvist managing to salvage fourth and fifth in the end. His fifth place also kept Lundqvist in the lead of the championship, albeit only six points ahead of Frost.

A day later, the second race was less straightforward. After a relatively quiet first half, where Lundqvist led unchallenged from pole and gapped Brabham, the race was stopped due to lightning in the area. When it resumed five hours later, it was rainy and the track was wet. While leader Lundqvist withstood the conditions, others were less fortunate: Brabham, Bogle, Roe Jr. and Ernie Francis Jr. all made mistakes on the slippery track, prompting multiple caution periods. In the end, Ludqvist won ahead of Rasmussen and Robb, who was locked in a tight battle for third with Pedersen, Frost and McElrea for much of the second half of the race. Lundqvist's win helped him expand his championship lead over Frost, which now stood at 33 points.

Next up, Indy Lights visited the Streets of Belle Isle in Detroit. Qualifying offered the same picture as before, with Lundqvist again claiming double poles. The first race saw problems for multiple cars, with the first caution coming three laps in, when Jacob Abel and Rasmussen collided, the former ending up in the wall. The latter then also hit the wall later in the race, prompting a second full course yellow. Lundqvist was the class of the field, comfortably pulling away on the start as well as on both restarts. He led home Pedersen and Brabham, while Frost, Robb and McElrea all were multiple laps down on the field due to different technical issues or small crashes. Lundqvist now had a margin of 58 points over Pedersen, his nearest championship challenger.

On day two of the Detroit double-header, Lundqvist continued his domination. He once again led from the start and no one managed to put him under pressure for the duration of the race. Fighting broke out behind, where McElrea rose to second at the start and fought with Robb and Rasmussen before Bogle hit the wall and brought out a caution. On the restart, Lundqvist and McElrea broke away, so the fight continued for third place until Rasmussen crashed for the second time in two races. This promoted Robb to third, who pressured McElrea at the restart, but was not able to pass him. A second perfect race in as many days lifted Lundqvist up to 283 championship points, with a sizable cushion of 84 points to the rest of the field.

The first half of the season ended at Road America with Robb leading an Andretti 1-2-3-4 in qualifying. Right at the start, Rasmussen overtook the fighting pair of Robb and McElrea to move into the race lead, before two cautions came out in quick succession, for Francis Jr. and Antonio Serravalle. In a tumultuous restart, Bogle was launched over the kerbs approaching turn five and tore down the catchfencing with his car, prompting a red flag. When the race was restarted several hours later, it was a calmer affair: Rasmussen moved into first at the restart to win and lead home his teammates Robb and McElrea on an all-Andretti podium. Lundqvist came fourth, his championship lead now 82 points ahead of new second-placed man Robb.

Second half 
The Mid-Ohio Sports Car Course hosted the start of the second half of the season, and McElrea claimed his second pole position. He started strong and left Lundqvist and Brabham to fight over second place, with Brabham eventually succeeding. Later in the race, the safety car was called when Roe Jr. spun and got stuck in the gravel. This brought McElrea back to the rest of the field, but he resisted Brabham's pressure and went on to claim his maiden victory. Lundqvist came third, after he seemed to have problems with his pace in the middle of the race, but he was able to keep Pedersen and the others behind. Because Robb was only fifth, Lundqvist gained further ground in the championship, with his lead now 87 points.

The first oval race of the season was next, at Iowa Speedway. McElrea once again started on pole, and led for the first half of the race, albeit under pressure from Lundqvist, who briefly got ahead twice by taking different lines into corners, but McElrea managed to stand his ground. This fighting allowed Robb and Brabham to close up to the leading duo, with the latter passing the former shortly before a caution came out when Roe Jr. hit the wall. On the restart, McElrea drifted wide, allowing second and third through. Brabham made his move for the lead with eight laps to go, the pair collided, Brabham sustained damage and dropped to fourth. Lundqvist crossed the line in first, but was handed a three-place penalty for the contact, promoting McElrea to the win ahead of Rasmussen, and Brabham to third. Lundqvist's championship lead sank to 77 points.

The next round was the Indy Lights series' debut around the Streets of Nashville. Pedersen set the pace in practice, but qualifying was cancelled when bad weather struck, so the field was formed by points order. This saw Lundqvist start at the front, where he handled early pressure from McElrea before the latter locked up and then fell back. Lundqvist opened a gap to the rest of the field, before Andretti teammates McElrea and Robb made contact when the former came through to take second. Battles up and down the field resulted in similar collisions, before Frost and Abel had bigger contact and Abel stopped on the road on the penultimate lap. This didn't hold up the leading trio, though, and Lundqvist took his fifth win of the season, growing his championship lead again, while McElrea took second place in the standings away from Robb.

It was back to oval racing then, as the next round was held on World Wide Technology Raceway. Lundqvist won qualifying and took pole, holding the lead at the start. Pedersen in second came straight under pressure by Brabham and Rasmussen, with the former soon overtaking him. This battle gave Lundqvist time to create a gap, which Brabham now set out to diminish. With five laps to go, Brabham had closed right up to Lundqvist's rear. The pair managed to avoid a repeat of the Iowa incident, Brabham cleanly overtook Lundqvist down the inside of turn three. Behind them, Rasmussen was comfortably in third before hitting the wall, limping back to the pits and retiring, promoting Pedersen to the podium. Brabham's win promoted him to second in the standings, but Lundqvist's lead now stood at its tallest, at 108 points.

Portland International Raceway welcomed teams and drivers for the penultimate destination of the year. Pedersen took his maiden pole in qualifying, and led the field to green. A caution was thrown early on when series debutant Flinn Lazier collided with Bogle and retired. After the restart, a fight for second place broke out between Frost, Rasmussen and Brabham. This eventually resulted in the first two making contact, which saw Frost hit the barriers head-on, causing another safety car. On the second restart, Pedersen quickly pulled away from Brabham and held his lead until the end to achieve his first Indy Lights victory. Lundqvist came third by virtue of avoiding risky fights, but Brabham's second place meant Lundqvist's championship lead of 103 points was barely not enough to decide the title there and then.

The championship finale was a double-header at WeatherTech Raceway Laguna Seca, and the weekend began with a double pole for Andretti, courtesy of Robb and Rasmussen. Lundqvist only needed to start the first race to secure his title, which he did in fifth place as Robb controlled the race from pole, gapping the field at the start and eventually finishing over ten seconds clear of the rest to take his maiden victory. Behind him, Rasmussen's race was a similarly quiet affair, as he also built a gap to McElrea in third, who had to defend against Abel in the latter stages of the race. The only other championship challenger, Brabham, was excluded from qualifying and had to start from the back. He managed to finish eighth in the end, while newly crowned champion Lundqvist was sixth. Robb's win lifted him to second in the standings.

A day later, the last race of the season started with Rasmussen on pole. He was similarly in control of the race as Robb the day before, but his gap to the field was smaller. Robb, who started in third, moved past champion Lundqvist early in the race and then kept the gap to Rasmussen at around a second all race, but was never close enough to start an attack. Brabham also overtook Lundqvist a lap after Robb, but could not keep up with the leading pair and finished in an untroubled third place. Robb's second place secured him second in the championship standings, as his nearest challenger McElrea had to start from the back and only climbed back up to eighth. This saw Brabham clinch third in the standings in his return to Indy Lights. Lundqvist's lead at the end of the season stood at 92 points.

Championship standings

Drivers' Championship 

 Scoring system

 The driver who qualified on pole is awarded one additional point.
 Every driver who led at least one lap got awarded a bonus point, the driver who led the most laps got two points

Teams' championship 

 Scoring system

 Single car teams received 3 bonus points as an equivalency to multi-car teams
 Only the best two results counted for teams fielding more than two entries

See also
 2022 IndyCar Series
 2022 Indy Pro 2000 Championship
 2022 U.S. F2000 National Championship
2022 USF Juniors

Notes

References

External links 
 

Indy Lights
Indy Lights seasons
Indy Lights
Indy Lights